Anna Danilina and Beatriz Haddad Maia defeated Vivian Heisen and Panna Udvardy in the final, 4–6, 7–5, [10–8], to win the women's doubles tennis title at the 2022 Sydney Tennis Classic.

Aleksandra Krunić and Kateřina Siniaková were the reigning champions, but did not compete this year.

Seeds

Draw

Draw

References

External links
Main draw

Sydney Tennis Classic - Doubles
2022 Sydney Tennis Classic
Sydney